Constantin Eraclide (1819–1875) was a Romanian jurist and politician.

After studying abroad, Eraclide returned home to enter the magistracy. He served as judge, court president, prosecutor, member of the state council, member and then head at the Court of Cassation. In 1863, he was general secretary at the Justice Ministry. He was Justice Minister for two weeks in November 1868, after which he left politics.

The author of several legal studies, Erbiceanu taught law at the University of Iași.

Notes

1819 births
1875 deaths
19th-century Romanian judges
Romanian prosecutors
High Court of Cassation and Justice judges
Romanian Ministers of Justice
Academic staff of Alexandru Ioan Cuza University